George Valavanis  was a Pontic Greek journalist and author born in Giresun.

He is remembered for his monumental work titled The Contemporary General History of Pontus which was published in 1925 and covered in great detail the Greek genocide in Pontus and the subsequent Population exchange between Greece and Turkey.

External links
Georgios Valavanis

Year of death missing
20th-century Greek writers
Greek journalists
Year of birth missing
Pontic Greeks
People from Giresun